Daniel Boone High School is a public high school located in Gray, Tennessee, US.  It is one of two high schools in the Washington County Schools system.

Daniel Boone High School opened in 1971–72 to serve the students of the northern half of Washington County, Tennessee.  Its feeder schools are Boones Creek Elementary, Fall Branch School (elementary and middle school), Gray Elementary, Ridgeview Elementary, and Sulphur Springs Elementary.  The school's athletic and academic teams compete as the "Trailblazers" and wear colors of scarlet and old gold.  Daniel Boone High School also has a Marine Corps ROTC program with  drill teams.

In 2008, the football field was named after long time head coach Ken Green.  He had been coach for over 30 years.

Daniel Boone's current football coach is Vice Principal Jeremy Jenkins, who also coaches softball. Jeremy, a Boone graduate has made the playoffs two years in a row.

Annually, the football team plays David Crockett High School in the "Musket Bowl" game. The rivalry, which goes back 49 years, is played between the two high schools in Washington County, Tennessee. The winner receives a replica musket, and unlike trophies in collegiate season bowl games, the musket is traded back and forth every year. (Unless one team wins the game three times in a row, then the school keeps the musket and a new musket must be purchased) As of 2020, the standings heavily favor Daniel Boone at 37–13.

Daniel Boone High School's enrollment has been fairly steady for the last few years, remaining between 1,100 and 1,300 students.

References

External links 
 

Public high schools in Tennessee
Schools in Washington County, Tennessee
1971 establishments in Tennessee